Ledda is a surname. Notable people with the surname include:

Elena Ledda (born 1959), Italian singer
Gavino Ledda (born 1938), Italian author and scholar

See also
Edda (given name)
Ledda Bay, bay of Antarctica

Surnames of Italian origin